Craig McPherson (born 27 March 1971) is a Scottish former professional footballer, who retired in 2006. He played as a left-back or left-sided midfielder.

McPherson started his career with his hometown club Greenock Morton, where he played mainly on the left hand side of midfield, occasionally being played as a full-back by then manager Allan McGraw. McPherson then played for Clyde and Airdrieonians. He followed manager Ian McCall in moving to Falkirk after the Airdrieonians club closed in 2002. He won promotion with Falkirk in 2005 and retired after one season in the Scottish Premier League.

McPherson returned to Falkirk, in 2009, as academy technical director.

In 2014, McPherson became assistant manager of his old club Morton, and signed a two-year extension in May 2016. After leaving Morton following Jim Duffy's sacking, McPherson became first team coach at Scottish League One side Dumbarton in September 2018, but left the club following Stephen Aitken's sacking. He then returned a fortnight later as assistant manager following Jim Duffy's appointment as Aitken's successor.

Honours
Airdrieonians
Scottish Challenge Cup: 2001–02

References

External links

1971 births
Living people
Greenock Morton F.C. players
Clyde F.C. players
Airdrieonians F.C. (1878) players
Falkirk F.C. players
Footballers from Greenock
Association football midfielders
Scottish Football League players
Scottish Premier League players
Falkirk F.C. non-playing staff
Greenock Morton F.C. non-playing staff
Scottish footballers
Dumbarton F.C. non-playing staff
Rangers F.C. non-playing staff
Association football coaches